Douglas John Tharme (born 17 August 1999) is an English professional footballer who plays for Accrington Stanley, on loan from Blackpool, as a defender.

Career
Born in Birkenhead, Thame spent his early career with Wrexham, AFC Telford United, Tamworth, Curzon Ashton, Connah's Quay Nomads and Southport. After signing for Blackpool, he moved on loan to Accrington Stanley in August 2022.

References

1999 births
Living people
Sportspeople from Birkenhead
Footballers from Merseyside
English footballers
Association football defenders
Wrexham A.F.C. players
AFC Telford United players
Tamworth F.C. players
Curzon Ashton F.C. players
Connah's Quay Nomads F.C. players
Southport F.C. players
Blackpool F.C. players
Accrington Stanley F.C. players
National League (English football) players
Southern Football League players
English Football League players
Cymru Premier players